87.8 UCFM (ACMA callsign: 1A12) is an independent student radio station transmitting from the campus of the University of Canberra. It broadcasts a professionally consulted College Radio niche music format - 24 hours a day, seven days a week, with a mix of news and current affairs. The radio station's studios are located within the lower level of "The Hub" complex on the university's Bruce campus, in Australia's capital city - Canberra.

UCFM transmits on FM 87.8 MHz across the District of Belconnen and North Canberra. It also streams its on-air program continuously online through links located on its website, Facebook page and TuneIn.

Launched in 1994 as CUE FM by the University of Canberra Union (UCU) - the original broadcast licence holder - all controlling interests (including the licence) have since been passed to the current UCFM Board. As an autonomous, non-academic student service, UCFM is therefore not listed as a university club or society. It receives no funding from either the UCU, nor the University of Canberra and covers operating costs by broadcasting a minimal amount of non-intrusive advertising, permitted under its licence conditions, as well as sponsorship, donations and membership fees.

87.8 UCFM positions itself on-air as "Canberra's Alternative" taking pride in its point of difference programming to its 18 to 40-year-old listeners with a non-stop, blend of Top 40 Pop/ Indie / Alternative music.

The station is a registered non-profit association overseen by its board, management team and a dedicated group of student and alumni volunteer members. Past and present UC students may become members of UCFM and can then be involved in all areas of the radio station, including as on-air presenters of its music format. One of its main purposes on campus is as a learning tool for students to assists members to make the important step from study into a professional media career post graduation.

In recent years UCFM volunteers, many with considerable radio industry experience have totally rebuilt the station's studios, transmitting equipment and on-air content extending its popularity to include many Canberra listeners outside the university, and online. External listeners, not associated with the university also have the ability to become UCFM 'Supporter' members.

On 10 August 2014, UCFM celebrated its 20th year of broadcasting.

Controversy from the Australian Communications and Media Authority
Unlike other Australian university campus radio stations, the University of Canberra's UCFM does not transmit on a full power Education/ Community Broadcast licence but is limited to a Narrowcast licence. Close proximity allocation by the Australian Communications and Media Authority of other narrowcast licences has caused interference of UCFM's signal and numerous applications for a full upgrade have been refused by the ACMA.

Despite UCFM's continuous broadcasting for more than two-decades, making it one of the original Narrowcast licences in Canberra the broadcast governing body neglected to reserve and offer UCFM a suitable frequency for a full Education/ Community Licence in the Canberra Licence Area Plan. The ACMA instead showing preference to allocate the scarce FM radio spectrum frequencies to existing ABC, SBS and Commercial Radio licence holder's second transmitters in the Tuggeranong Valley, as well as the establishment of newer niche Community FM stations dedicated to the Arts, Multiculturalism and Religion.

External links
Official site

See also
 List of radio stations in Australia

Radio stations in Canberra
Student radio stations in Australia
University of Canberra
1994 establishments in Australia
Radio stations established in 1994